Waterville Central School District is a school district headquartered in Waterville, New York. It operates Waterville Central School.

References

External links
 
School districts in New York (state)
Education in Oneida County, New York